The Health Foundation is an independent charity for health care for people in the UK.

The organisation’s aim is a healthier population, supported by high quality health care that can be equitably accessed. Its programs include making grants to those working at the front line, carrying out research and policy analysis.

History

As the second largest endowed foundation in the UK focusing on health, they spend around £30 million a year on improving health and health care.

The Health Foundation was founded in 1983 as the PPP Medical Trust with a donation of £350,000 a year from Private Patients Plan Limited.  In 1998, the organisation, then named the PPP Healthcare Medical Trust, became fully independent with an endowment of approximately £540 million resulting from the sale of the PPP Healthcare group to Guardian Royal Exchange. In 2003 the organisation was renamed the Health Foundation to signal its completely independent status as a grant-making charity. The Health Foundation has no connection to PPP and is accountable only to its independent board of trustees and the Charity Commission.

Dr Jennifer Dixon is chief executive of the Health Foundation. Dr Dixon was Chief Executive of the Nuffield Trust from 2008 to 2013. Prior to this, she was director of policy at The King’s Fund and was the policy advisor to the Chief Executive of the National Health Service between 1998 and 2000.

The Chair of Governors is Sir Hugh Taylor.

Stephen Thornton was the Chief Executive from 2001 until October 2013 when he retired.

References

External links
 

Health charities in England
Healthcare in the United Kingdom
Organisations based in the City of London